Entranceway at Main Street at Lafayette Boulevard is a suburban residential subdivision entranceway built about 1920 by Orange & Black Corp., Developers.  It is located on Main Street (New York State Route 5) in the town of Amherst within Erie County.  It consists of roofed stone archways, connecting half-height stone walls, and stone posts located on either corner.

It was added to the National Register of Historic Places in 2009.

References

Buildings and structures on the National Register of Historic Places in New York (state)
Buildings and structures completed in 1920
Buildings and structures in Erie County, New York
National Register of Historic Places in Erie County, New York